George Montgomery (nicknamed "Ohio George") is an American gasser drag racer.

Montgomery won an NHRA national title in a gas class seven times, once in A/G, four in A/GS, and twice in AA/G (supercharged).  He was also thrice Gas Eliminator champion, meaning he had the quickest gasser at the meet.

He also drove the AA/G Ford Prefect he named The Gasser Passer.

In 1967, Montgomery was offered a new Ford Mustang, and promptly retired the ill-handling Willys.

Montgomery was a continuing favorite among touring match racers, often facing "Big John" Mazmanian and K. S. Pittman, among others.

Montgomery was also inducted to the International Drag Racing Hall of Fame.

He was inducted into the Motorsports Hall of Fame of America on March 17, 2020.

Notes

Sources
Davis, Larry. Gasser Wars, North Branch, MN:  Cartech, 2003, pp. 180–8.

Dragster drivers
Racing drivers from Ohio